Angus Fletcher was a British businessman and member of the Legislative Council of Hong Kong.

Fletcher was made Justice of the Peace in 1855. He was appointed member of the Legislative Council on 10 December 1860 in room of George Lyall who resigned on leaving Hong Kong. He resigned his seat on the Legislative Council in 1862 and subsequently replaced by Charles Wilson Murray.

References

Members of the Legislative Council of Hong Kong
British expatriates in Hong Kong
19th-century British businesspeople